A New Dawn for the Dead is the third studio album by the British death metal band
Gorerotted, released in 2005 through Metal Blade Records.

Track listing
 "...And Everything Went Black" – 4:12
 "Pain as a Prelude to Death" – 3:09
 "Nervous Gibbering Wreck" – 3:08
 "Adding Insult to Injury" – 3:30
 "Fable of Filth" – 2:49
 "Dead Drunk" – 2:58
 "A Very Grave Business" – 3:42
 "Horrorday in Haiti" – 2:19
 "Selection and Dissection of Parts for Resurrection" – 4:49

Line up
Ben'Rotted – Vocals
Phil Wilson – Bass/Vocals
Tim'Rotted – Guitar
Matt Hoban – Guitar
"Junky" Jon Rushforth – Drums

References 

2005 albums
Gorerotted albums
Metal Blade Records albums